The languages of Turkey, apart from the official language Turkish, include the widespread Kurdish (Kurmanji), the moderately prevalent minority languages Arabic and Zazaki, and a number of less common minority languages, some of which are guaranteed by the 1923 Treaty of Lausanne.

History

Turkey has historically been the home to many now extinct languages. These include Hittite, the earliest Indo-European language for which written evidence exists (circa 1600 BCE to 1100 BCE when the Hittite Empire existed). The other Anatolian languages included Luwian and later Lycian, Lydian and Milyan. All these languages are believed to have become extinct at the latest around the 1st century BCE due to the Hellenization of Anatolia which led to Greek in a variety of dialects becoming the common language.

Urartian belonging to the Hurro-Urartian language family existed in eastern Anatolia around Lake Van. It existed as the language of the kingdom of Urartu from about the 9th century BCE until the 6th century. Hattian is attested in Hittite ritual texts but is not related to the Hittite language or to any other known language; it dates from the 2nd millennium BCE.

In the post-Tanzimat period French became a common language among educated people, even though no ethnic group in the empire natively spoke French. Johann Strauss, author of "Language and power in the late Ottoman Empire," wrote that "In a way reminiscent of English in the contemporary world, French was almost omnipresent in the Ottoman lands." Strauss also stated that French was "a sort of semi-official language", which "to some extent" had "replaced Turkish as an 'official' language for non-Muslims". Therefore late empire had multiple French-language publications, and several continued to operate when the Republic of Turkey was declared in 1923. However French-language publications began to close in the 1930s.

Constitutional rights

Official language
Article 3 of the Constitution of Turkey defines Turkish as the official language of Turkey.

Minority language rights
Article 42 of the Constitution explicitly prohibits educational institutions to teach any language other than Turkish as a mother tongue to Turkish citizens.

Due to Article 42 and its longtime restrictive interpretation, ethnic minorities have been facing severe restrictions in the use of their mother languages.

Concerning the incompatibility of this provision with the International Bill of Human Rights, Turkey signed the International Covenants on Civil and Political Rights and on Economic, Social and Cultural Rights only with reservations constraining minority rights and the right to education. Furthermore, Turkey hasn't signed either of the Council of Europe's Framework Convention for the Protection of National Minorities, the European Charter for Regional or Minority Languages, or the anti-discrimination Protocol 12 to the European Convention on Human Rights.This particular constitutional provision has been contested both internationally and within Turkey. The provision has been criticized by minority groups, notably the Kurdish community. In October 2004, the Turkish State's Human Rights Advisory Board called for a constitutional review in order to bring Turkey's policy on minorities in line with international standards, but was effectively muted. It was also criticized by EU member states, the OSCE, and international human rights organizations, including Human Rights Watch who observe that "the Turkish government accepts the language rights of the Jewish, Greek and Armenian minorities as being guaranteed by the 1923 Treaty of Lausanne. But the government claims that these are Turkey's only minorities, and that any talk of minority rights beyond this is just separatism".

Supplementary language education
In 2012, the Ministry of Education included Kurdish (based on both Kurmanji and Zazaki dialects) to the academic programme of the basic schools as optional classes from the fifth year on.

Later, the Ministry of Education also included Abkhaz, Adyghe, Standard Georgian, and Laz languages in 2013, and Albanian as well as Bosnian languages in February 2017.

In 2015, the Turkey’s Ministry of Education announced that as of the 2016-17 academic year, Arabic courses (as a second language) will be offered to students in elementary school starting in second grade. The Arabic courses will be offered as an elective language course like German, French and English. According to a prepared curriculum, second and third graders will start learning Arabic by listening-comprehension and speaking, while introduction to writing will join these skills in fourth grade and after fifth grade students will start learning the language in all its four basic skills.

Statistics

1965 Census

KONDA, 2006 
The following table lists the mother tongues of people in Turkey by percentage of their speakers.

Ethnologue, 2009 
Ethnologue lists many minority and immigrant languages in Turkey some of which are spoken by large numbers of people.

Not included in the report by Ethnologue is the Megleno-Romanian language, spoken by the Megleno-Romanians, who number around 5,000 in the country.

aExpanded Graded Intergenerational Disruption Scale (EGIDS) of Ethnologue:
0 (International): "The language is widely used between nations in trade, knowledge exchange, and international policy."
1 (National): "The language is used in education, work, mass media, and government at the national level."
2 (Provincial): "The language is used in education, work, mass media, and government within major administrative subdivisions of a nation."
3 (Wider Communication): "The language is used in work and mass media without official status to transcend language differences across a region."
4 (Educational): "The language is in vigorous use, with standardization and literature being sustained through a widespread system of institutionally supported education."
5 (Developing): "The language is in vigorous use, with literature in a standardized form being used by some though this is not yet widespread or sustainable."
6a (Vigorous): "The language is used for face-to-face communication by all generations and the situation is sustainable."
6b (Threatened): "The language is used for face-to-face communication within all generations, but it is losing users."
7 (Shifting): "The child-bearing generation can use the language among themselves, but it is not being transmitted to children."
8a (Moribund): "The only remaining active users of the language are members of the grandparent generation and older."
8b (Nearly Extinct): "The only remaining users of the language are members of the grandparent generation or older who have little opportunity to use the language."
9 (Dormant): "The language serves as a reminder of heritage identity for an ethnic community, but no one has more than symbolic proficiency."
10 (Extinct): "The language is no longer used and no one retains a sense of ethnic identity associated with the language."

Ethnologue, 2022 
The following languages are listed as having 50,000 or more total speakers in Turkey according to the 2022 edition of Ethnologue. Entries identified by Ethnologue as macrolanguages (such as Arabic, Persian, Pashto, Chinese, and  Zaza, encompassing all their respective varieties) are not included in this section.

See also
 Demographics of Turkey
 Citizen speak Turkish!

Notes

References

Further reading

 
  - Thesis submitted to Istanbul Sehir University